Volare Airlines was an airline based in Kyiv, Ukraine. It was established in 1994 and operated its first charter flight in November 1995. It operated charter and regular flights from its base airports at Rivne and Kyiv.

History 
The airline was shut down by the Ukrainian civil aviation authority over safety concerns in 2009. The carrier was also blacklisted by the European Union.

Services 
Volare Airlines operated air cargo flights within Ukraine and CIS, Europe, Middle East, Far East and Africa.

Fleet 
The Volare Airlines fleet included the following aircraft (as of August 2006):

6 Antonov An-12
2 Ilyushin Il-76MD
1 Ilyushin Il-76TD

References

External links
Site in Ukrainian

Defunct airlines of Ukraine
Airlines established in 1994
Airlines disestablished in 2009
Defunct cargo airlines
Cargo airlines of Ukraine
Ukrainian companies established in 1994
2009 disestablishments in Ukraine